Parramore is a neighborhood in west-central Orlando, Florida. It is a historical neighborhood for Orlando residents of African descent, and suffered greatly during the Jim Crow era. In 2015, the unemployment rate was reported as 23.8% and median household income was $15,493.

The area was developed as a segregated African-American community. It was built in the 1880s by Orlando's fourteenth mayor, James B. Parramore, as a development "to house the blacks employed in the households of white Orlandoans."

While the historic east border of Parramore was Division Avenue (which marked the line where African-American residents living in the west could not cross into the east after sundown), Interstate 4 was constructed directly between Parramore and the prosperous and mostly white neighborhoods of central downtown, just east of Division Avenue and just west of the railroad tracks. Parramore's "official" boundaries (according to the city of Orlando) extend to Interstate 4, but the regions in between Division and the interstate are generally not residential, hosting such facilities as the Amway Center and the Bob Carr Performing Arts Centre. Smaller businesses are located on the west side of Division Avenue and include grocery stores, barber shops, and soul food restaurants.

Many of the issues facing Parramore historically and currently can be traced to institutionalized or even unintentional neglect from the city and county governments, exacerbated by the fact that the city limits of Orlando do not extend all the way through, and therefore one block might be dependent on city services while being bordered on three sides by blocks that depend on county services. The western border of Parramore is Orange Blossom Trail, a thoroughfare where violence and other crimes are common.

Orlando officially considers Parramore to be three separate neighborhoods: Lake Dot (between Colonial Drive and Amelia Street), Callahan (between Amelia Street and Central Boulevard), and Holden/Parramore (between Central Boulevard and Gore Street). All three are bounded on the east by Interstate 4 and on the west by Orange Blossom Trail.

A soccer stadium, Exploria Stadium, was built in Parramore along West Church Street between Glenn Lane and Terry Avenue.

References

Neighborhoods in Orlando, Florida
History of racial segregation in the United States